Gustavo Gotti (born 20 October 1993) is an Argentine professional footballer who plays as a forward for Chilean club Fernández Vial.

Career
He made his debut against Atlético Policial on a 4–1 loss for the Copa Argentina in 2011 with Dario Franco as head coach. He scored his first goal for Instituto on a 3–2 win against Sarmiento in March 2013.
In July 2013 he was loaned to Las Palmas for one year. He scored his first hat-trick for the club on a win 3–1 win against Argentino Penarol at Estadio Mario Alberto Kempes on September 27, 2013. He scored his 4th goal against Racing de Cordoba. He is currently the top scorer for the club with 14 goals. After the one-year loan at Las Palmas, Gotti returns to Instituto scoring his second goal for the club against Arsenal de Sarandi on a 3–1 win. On November 5 he scores the winning goal, 2–1 against Boca Unidos on the last minute of the game. ( His third official goal at Instituto (2- Nacional B -- 1- Copa Arg) ). Gotti scored his 4th goal against Aldosivi on November 30, 2014 (first goal at home). New coach Carlos Mazzola has showed confidence
on the striker for his well performance and decides to give him another chance as a starter vs Guarani Antonio Franco in the last game of 2014, Gotti did not fail and scored his 5th goal for the club on a 2–1 win for Instituto. In 2015, he scored his penalty kick against Belgrano de Cordoba to advance on the Copa Argentina. On May 31, he scored his most celebrated goal against Douglas Haig in the last minute of the game at Alta Cordoba home stadium which meant the 3-2 winning score. He scored once more on the victory of his team 2 to 0 against Club Sportivo Estudiantes off a corner kick. He later scored vs Los Andes twice, Patronato, Juventud Unida, Gimnasia de Jujuy, and Club Sportivo Estudiantes finishing with 9 goals in the 2015 season. In 2016, he scored the winning goal (2-1) at Estadio Mario Alberto Kempes in a pre-season match vs Talleres de Cordoba.

Career statistics

References

External links

1993 births
Living people
People from Córdoba, Argentina
Argentine footballers
Argentine expatriate footballers
Instituto footballers
Club Atlético Las Palmas players
O'Higgins F.C. footballers
Deportes Temuco footballers
Unión San Felipe footballers
Deportes Santa Cruz footballers
C.D. Arturo Fernández Vial footballers
Primera Nacional players
Torneo Argentino B players
Chilean Primera División players
Primera B de Chile players
Expatriate footballers in Chile
Argentine expatriate sportspeople in Chile
Argentine expatriates in Chile
Association football forwards
Footballers from Córdoba, Argentina